A stigmator is a component of electron microscopes that reduces astigmatism of the beam by imposing a weak electric or magnetic quadrupole field on the electron beam.

Background

For early electron microscopes - between the 1940s and 1960s - astigmatism was one of the main performance limiting factors. Sources of this astigmatism include misaligned objectives, non-uniform magnetic fields of the lenses, which was especially hard to correct, lenses that aren't perfectly circular and contamination on the objective aperture.  Therefore, to improve the resolving resolution, the astigmatism had to be corrected. The first commercially used stigmators on electron microscopes were installed in the early 1960s.

The stigmatic correction is done using an electric or magnetic field perpendicular to the beam. By adjusting the magnitude and azimuth of the stigmator field, asymmetric astigmatization can be compensated for. Stigmators produce weak fields compared to the electromagnetic lenses they correct, as usually only minor correction are necessary.

Number of poles
Stigmators create a quadrupole field, and thus have to consist of at least four poles, but hexapole, octopole and dodecapole stigmatizors are also used, with octopole stigmators being the most common. The octopole (or higher order of poles) stigmatizers also produce a quadrupole field, but use their additional poles to align the imposed field with the direction of the stigmatization ellipticity.

Types

Magnetic stigmator
The magnetic stigmator is a weak cylindrical lens that can correct the cylindrical component of the beam. It can consist of metal rods which induce an magnetic field, which are inserted with their long axis towards the beam center. By retracting or extending the rods, the astigmatism can be compensated.

Electromagnetic
Electromagnetic stigmators are stigmators that are integrated with the lenses and directly deform the magnetic field of the lens(es). These were the first types of stigmators to be used.

Automatic stigmators
In most cases, the astigmatism can be corrected using a constant stigmator field which is adjusted by the microscope operator. The main cause of astigmatism, the non-uniform magnetic field produced by the lenses, usually does not change noticeable during a TEM session. A recent development are computer-controlled stigmators, which usually use the Fourier transform of the image to find the ideal stigmator setting. The Fourier transform of an astigmatic image is usually elliptically shaped. For a stigmatic image, it is round, this property can be used by algorithms to reduce the astigmatic aberration.

Multiple stigmator systems
Normally, one stigmator is sufficient, but TEMs normally contain three stigmators: one to stigmatize the source beam, one to stigmatize real-space images, and one to stigmatize diffraction patterns. These are commonly referred to as condensor, objective, and intermediate (or diffraction) stigmators. The use of three post-sample stigmators is proposed to reduce linear distortion

See also
Anastigmat, a photographic lens completely corrected for the three main optical aberrations

References

Electron microscopy
Electron beam
Physical optics